The men's 3000 metres at the 2022 World Athletics Indoor Championships took place on 18 and 20 March 2022.

Results

Heats
Qualification: First 4 in each heat (Q) and the next 3 fastest (q) advance to the Final

The heats were started on 18 March at 13:25.

Final
The final was started on 20 March at 12:10.

References

3000 metres
3000 metres at the World Athletics Indoor Championships